Muqayyash (Muqqaish, Mukkaiish, Mukaish, Mukesh, मुक़य्यश, "مقیش" ) is an ancient craft of brocade embroidery work with silver yarn on silk cloth from Gujarat, India. The silk is ornamented with a silver stripe pattern. Muqayyash is one of the Mughal period silk cloth, and it is recorded in Ain-i-Akbari. The muqayyash was one of the fine brocades of Gujrat among a tus, daraibaf, kurtahwar. It was one of the expensive cloths of that time, priced at 2-50 gold Muhr.

Name 
Muqayyash is an Arabicized word driven from the Hindi word Kesh, which means hairs. Muqayyash is also known as badla and fardi work. The Mukaish work with smaller stitch was called Murri ka kaam, taka, dana.

Use 
Muqayyash is in use since the Mughal empire, and Nur Jahan was using these silver embellished cloths.

Present fashion 
The silk with Muqayyash work is famous for bridal and festival wear and ladies Sari. Muqayyash's work is still in fashion with celebrities in Bollywood. It is one of the choices of Indian fashion designers like Manish Malhotra, Anjul Bhandari, etc.  Priyanka Chopra wore mukaish worked ivory sari while receiving the Danny Kaye Humanitarian Award at the 2019 UNICEF Snowflake Ball on December 3. The sari was designed by Abu Jani Sandeep Khosla.

See also 
 Brocade
 Bafta cloth
 Tansukh cloth
 Khasa (cloth)

References 

Figured fabrics